Maor Peretz (born 18 November 1983) is a retired Israeli football defender.

References

1983 births
Living people
Israeli footballers
F.C. Ashdod players
Hapoel Nir Ramat HaSharon F.C. players
Hapoel Tel Aviv F.C. players
Hapoel Ironi Kiryat Shmona F.C. players
Hapoel Kfar Saba F.C. players
Maccabi Yavne F.C. players
Association football defenders
Israeli Premier League players